Then Came You is a 2020 American romantic comedy film directed by Adriana Trigiani, from a screenplay by Kathie Lee Gifford. It stars Craig Ferguson, Gifford, Ford Kiernan, Phyllida Law and Elizabeth Hurley.

The film was theatrically released in the United States on September 30, 2020, by Vertical Entertainment.

Synopsis
Annabelle, a lonely widow, plans a trip around the world, with her husband’s ashes in tow, to visit the places they loved in the movies. Eventually, she arrives at the Inn in Loch Lomond, run by Howard, a Scotsman (played by Ferguson). In the first stop on her planned journey, the two meet and their lives are changed forever with a second chance at love.

Cast
 Craig Ferguson as Howard
 Kathie Lee Gifford as Annabelle
 Ford Kiernan as Gavin
 Phyllida Law as Arlene
 Elizabeth Hurley as Clare

Production
In May 2018, it was announced Kathie Lee Gifford and Craig Ferguson had joined the cast of the film, with Adriana Trigiani directing from a screenplay by Gifford.  Brett James would compose original music for the film with lyrics written by Gifford, with the theme song being titled "Love Me to Death" sung by Gifford.

Principal photography began in June 2018.

Release
In September 2020, Vertical Entertainment acquired distribution rights to the film, and set it for a September 30, 2020, one-night theatrical release, before a video on demand release on October 2, 2020.

Reception 
On Rotten Tomatoes the film has an approval rating of  based on reviews from  critics.

References

External links
 

2020 romantic comedy films
American romantic comedy films
Films shot in Scotland
Vertical Entertainment films
2020 films
2020s English-language films
2020s American films